

The Honourable Order of Rama was established on 22 July 1918 (B.E. 2461) by King Rama VI of the Kingdom of Siam (now Thailand), to be bestowed onto those who have rendered special military services either in peace or in wartime.

History

Classes
The order consists of six classes:

Selected recipients 
Ferdinand Foch Knight Grand Commander
Douglas Haig, 1st Earl Haig Knight Grand Commander
Philippe Pétain Knight Grand Commander
Joseph Joffre Knight Grand Commander
Américo Tomás Knight Grand Commander
Francisco Franco Knight Grand Commander
Ayub Khan Knight Grand Commander
Sarit Thanarat Knight Grand Commander
Thanom Kittikachorn Knight Grand Commander
Praphas Charusathien Knight Grand Commander, Knight Commander 
Prem Tinsulanonda Knight Grand Commander, Knight Commander 
Chavalit Yongchaiyudh Knight Commander
Arthit Kamlang-ek Knight Commander, Commander, Companion
Seripisut Temiyavet Member of "The Rama Medal for Gallantry in Action"
Surayud Chulanont Member of "The Rama Medal"
Prayuth Chan-o-cha Member of "The Rama Medal for Gallantry in Action"
Thanasak Patimaprakorn Member of "The Rama Medal for Gallantry in Action"
Francisco Franco Knight Grand Commander

References

External links

 The Honourable Order of Rama, Secretariat to the Cabinet of Thailand

 
Rama, Order Of
Rama, Order Of
Rama, Order Of
1918 establishments in Siam